Kalbali Arab (also Romanized as Kalb‘alī ‘Arab and Kalbalī ‘Arab) is a village in Abezhdan Rural District, Abezhdan District, Andika County, Khuzestan Province, Iran. At the 2006 census, its population was 105, in 18 families.

References 

Populated places in Andika County